Interferon gamma receptor 2 also known as IFN-γR2 is a protein which in humans is encoded by the IFNGR2 gene.

Function 

This gene (IFNGR2) encodes the non-ligand-binding beta chain of the gamma interferon receptor. Human interferon-gamma receptor is a multimer of two IFN-γR1 chains (encoded by IFNGR1) and two IFN-γR2 chains.

Clinical significance 

Defects in IFNGR2 are a cause of autosomal recessive mendelian susceptibility to mycobacterial disease (MSMD), also known as familial disseminated atypical mycobacterial infection.
All known mutations in IFNGR2 are collected in the IFNGR2 mutation database.

References